Roborough may refer to:

Places in Devon, England
 Roborough, South Hams, near Plymouth
 Roborough Hundred, a former administrative division
 RAF Roborough, a former Royal Air Force station
 Roborough, Torridge, near Winkleigh
 Roborough Castle, close to Lynton

Other
 Baron Roborough, a title in the Peerage of the United Kingdom